This is a list of schools in the Roman Catholic Diocese of Baton Rouge.

High schools
 Ascension Catholic Diocesan High School (Donaldsonville)
 Catholic High School (Baton Rouge)
 Catholic High School of Pointe Coupee (New Roads)
 Saint Thomas Aquinas Diocesan Regional High School (Tangipahoa Parish)
 St. John the Evangelist Interparochial High School (Plaquemine)
 St. Joseph's Academy (Baton Rouge)
 St. Michael the Archangel Diocesan Regional High School (Shenandoah, East Baton Rouge Parish)

Elementary schools
 Assumption Parish
 St. Elizabeth Interparochial School (Paincourtville)
 Ascension Parish
 Ascension Catholic Interparochial Elementary School (Donaldsonville)
 St. Theresa School (Gonzales)
 St. John Primary School (Prairieville)
 East Baton Rouge Parish
Baton Rouge
Most Blessed Sacrament School
Our Lady of Mercy School
Redemptorist Elementary School
Sacred Heart of Jesus School
St. Aloysius School
St. Francis Xavier Interparochial School
St. George School
St. Jean Vianney School
St. Jude the Apostle School
St. Louis King of France School
St. Thomas More School
City of Central
St. Alphonsus Liquori School
 Iberville Parish
 St. John the Evangelist Interparochial Elementary School (Plaquemine)
 Pointe Coupee Parish
 Catholic Elementary School of Pointe Coupee (New Roads)
 St. James Parish
 St. Peter Chanel Interparochial School (Paulina)
 Tangipahoa Parish
 Holy Ghost School (Hammond)
 Mater Dolorosa School (Independence)
 St. Joseph School (Ponchatoula)
 West Baton Rouge Parish
 Holy Family School (Port Allen) - It opened on September 5, 1949, with 146 students in Kindergarten through grade 3, with it becoming K-5 in 1950, and with one grade level per subsequent year until it was K-8, with 345 students, in 1953. Its current grade 4-8 building opened in 1961 and its library opened in 1990.

Former schools
Redemptorist High School

References

External links
 Diocese of Baton Rouge Schools Office

Baton Rouge, Roman Catholic Archdiocese of
Education in Atlanta
Schools
Baton Rouge